Diva Magazine is a fashion, entertainment, travel, lifestyle and beauty magazine of Pakistan, a monthly publication that is published from Karachi and is distributed across Pakistan.

History 
Diva Magazine Pakistan was founded by Raheel Rao in 1999 but the magazine started publishing in 2002. Diva Magazine is only Pakistan's fashion and entertainment magazine that launched new faces. Diva Magazine Pakistan has been known for its magazine covers that cover divas. Its headquarters are located in DHA, Karachi, Pakistan.

Main categories 
Diva Magazine main categories are E-Diva, Fashion, Entertainment, Beauty, Lifestyle, Travel, Food, and Interviews.

References

External links
 

2002 establishments in Pakistan
English-language magazines published in Pakistan
Magazines established in 2002
Mass media in Karachi
Online magazines published in Pakistan
Pakistani fashion
Women's magazines published in Pakistan
Women's fashion magazines